Óscar Alejandro Torres Mora (born 6 April 1995) is a Mexican professional footballer that plays for Cancún.

References

External links
 

Living people
1995 births
Footballers from Mexico City
Mexican footballers
Association football defenders
C.F. Pachuca players
Mineros de Zacatecas players
Alebrijes de Oaxaca players
Cancún F.C. footballers
Liga MX players
Ascenso MX players
Liga de Expansión MX players